Boronia parviflora, commonly known as the swamp boronia, small boronia, tiny boronia, or small-flowered boronia, is a plant in the citrus family Rutaceae and is endemic south-eastern Australia. It is a weak, low shrub with elliptic to egg-shaped leaves with finely toothed edges and up to three pink, white or green four-petalled flowers arranged at or near the ends of the stems.

Description
The leaves are sometimes reddish or purplish, especially on the lower side. The four petals are pale to bright pink, white or sometimes green, about the same length as the sepals and have their bases overlapping. The stamens are hairy and the stigma is minute. There are eight stamens in the flowers of plants in Queensland, New South Wales and Tasmania but sometimes only four or six in those of western Victoria and South Australia. Flowering mainly occurs from August to March.

Taxonomy and naming
Boronia parviflora was first formally described in 1798 by James Edward Smith and the description was published in his book Tracts relating to natural history. Smith gave it the common name "pale-flowered boronia". The specific epithet (parviflora) is derived from the Latin parvus meaning "small" and -florus meaning "-flowered".

Distribution and habitat
Swamp boronia grows in seasonally wet areas of heath, woodland, sedge and wallum. It is the most widely distributed boronia and is found in near-coastal areas south from the Sunshine Coast in Queensland, through New South Wales as far inland as Boonoo Boonoo, in Tasmania and in scattered locations in southern Victoria, and south-eastern South Australia.

Conservation
This boronia is classified as "very restricted" in South Australia. The main threats to the species in that state are grazing, trampling and competition from introduced pasture species.

References 

parviflora
Flora of New South Wales
Flora of Queensland
Flora of South Australia
Flora of Victoria (Australia)
Flora of Tasmania
Plants described in 1798
Taxa named by James Edward Smith